The 2014 US Open was a tennis tournament played on outdoor hard courts. It was the 134th edition of the US Open, the fourth and final Grand Slam event of the year. It took place at the USTA Billie Jean King National Tennis Center.

Rafael Nadal was the defending champion in the men's event; however, on 18 August, the Spaniard announced his withdrawal from the event after failing to recover from a wrist injury, while Serena Williams was the two-time defending champion in the women's event.

In the men's singles competition, Marin Čilić won his first grand slam, while Serena Williams won her Open era record-tying sixth title in the women's singles competition, tying Chris Evert, and her eighteenth grand slam title, tying Evert and Martina Navratilova. Winning the men's doubles, Bob Bryan and Mike Bryan became the most victorious doubles team in Open era history at the tournament, and this was the team's 100th title together and sixteenth grand slam title tying Todd Woodbridge for the Open era record. Ekaterina Makarova and Elena Vesnina won women's doubles competition title, becoming two-time grand slam champions with their victory at the 2013 French Open. The winning mixed doubles team was Sania Mirza and Bruno Soares, and for Mirza it was her third mixed doubles grand slam title in her career and Soares' second grand slam title for his career. It was Soares' second US Open title in mixed doubles, and it was the first for Mirza.

Tournament

The 2014 US Open was the 134th edition of the tournament and it is held at the USTA Billie Jean King National Tennis Center in Flushing Meadows–Corona Park of Queens in New York City, United States.

The tournament was an event run by the International Tennis Federation (ITF) and was part of the 2014 ATP World Tour and the 2014 WTA Tour calendars under the Grand Slam category. The tournament consisted of both men's and women's singles and doubles draws as well as a mixed doubles event. There were singles and doubles events for both boys and girls (players under 18), which was part of the Grade A category of tournaments, and singles, doubles and quad events for men's and women's wheelchair tennis players as part of the NEC tour under the Grand Slam category.

The tournament was played on hard courts and is taking place over a series of 17 courts with DecoTurf surface, including the three main showcourts, Arthur Ashe Stadium, Louis Armstrong Stadium and Grandstand.

Notable events
 In winning the women's singles, Serena Williams tied a number of Open Era records:
 It was her sixth title tying fellow American Chris Evert.
 It was her eighteenth grand slam singles title tying the American record held by Evert and Martina Navratilova.
 In winning the men's doubles, Bob and Mike Bryan reached a number of major milestones:
 It was their 100th ATP World Tour title as a team. 
 This was their fifth US Open title, taking them past Bob Lutz and Stan Smith for the most in the Open era, and drawing them level with 1880s players Richard Sears and James Dwight for the most overall.
 They also extended their own records for most Grand Slam titles as a team (16) and most consecutive seasons with at least one Grand Slam title (10).
The men's singles final represented the first time a Grand Slam men's singles final had not featured a member of the "Big Four" since the 2005 Australian Open.

Broadcast
The tournament was scheduled to be broadcast in more than 200 countries around the world. In the United States the tournament was broadcast live on CBS, ESPN, and Tennis Channel. CBS ended its 47-year tenure as the broadcast home of the Open. Beginning in 2015, ESPN will have the exclusive television rights to all USTA events, including the Open and the US Open Series.

In 2014, live coverage emanated from seven courts, including Arthur Ashe Stadium, Louis Armstrong Stadium and the Grandstand, as well as Court 5, Court 11, Court 13, and Court 17.

Point and prize money distribution

Point distribution
Below is a series of tables for each of the competitions showing the ranking points on offer for each event.

Senior

Wheelchair

Junior

Prize money
The US Open total prize money for 2014 was increased by 11.7 percent to a record $38,251,760, which potentially could reach over 40 million dollars, as the top three finishers in the Emirates Airline US Open Series may earn up to an additional $2.6 million in bonus money at the US Open.

* per team

Bonus prize money
Top three players in the 2014 US Open Series received bonus prize money, depending on where they finish in the 2014 US Open, according to money schedule below.

Singles players
2014 US Open – Men's singles

2014 US Open – Women's singles

Day-by-day summaries

Events

Seniors

Men's singles

  Marin Čilić defeated  Kei Nishikori, 6–3, 6–3, 6–3
• It was Čilić's 1st career Grand Slam singles title. He was the first Croatian tennis player to win the US Open.
• Nishikori became the first Japanese tennis player (male or female) to reach the Grand Slam final. He was also the first Asian man to reach the Grand Slam final.

Women's singles

  Serena Williams defeated  Caroline Wozniacki 6–3, 6–3
• It was Williams' 18th career Grand Slam singles title and her 6th at the US Open. It was her 6th career title of the year.

Men's doubles

 Bob Bryan /  Mike Bryan defeated  Marcel Granollers /  Marc López 6–4, 6–3
• It was Bob and Mike's 16th career Grand Slam doubles title and their 5th at the US Open.

Women's doubles

 Ekaterina Makarova /  Elena Vesnina defeated  Martina Hingis /  Flavia Pennetta, 2–6, 6–3, 6–2
• It was Makarova and Vesnina's 2nd career Grand Slam doubles titles and their 1st at the US Open.

Mixed doubles

 Sania Mirza /  Bruno Soares defeated  Abigail Spears /  Santiago González, 6–1, 2–6, [11–9]
• It was Mirza's 3rd career Grand Slam mixed doubles title and her 1st at the US Open.
• It was Soares' 2nd career Grand Slam mixed doubles title and his 2nd at the US Open.

Juniors

Boys' singles

  Omar Jasika defeated  Quentin Halys, 2–6, 7–5, 6–1

Girls' singles

  Marie Bouzková defeated  Anhelina Kalinina, 6–4, 7–6(7–5)

Boys' doubles

  Omar Jasika /  Naoki Nakagawa defeated  Rafael Matos /  João Menezes, 6–3, 7–6(8–6)

Girls' doubles

  İpek Soylu /  Jil Teichmann defeated  Vera Lapko /  Tereza Mihalíková, 5–7, 6–2, [10–7]

Wheelchair

Wheelchair men's singles

  Shingo Kunieda defeated   Gustavo Fernández, 7-6(7-0), 6-4

Wheelchair women's singles

  Yui Kamiji defeated  Aniek van Koot, 6–3, 6–3

Wheelchair quad singles

  Andrew Lapthorne defeated  David Wagner, 7–5, 6–2

Wheelchair men's doubles

  Stéphane Houdet /  Shingo Kunieda defeated  Gordon Reid /  Maikel Scheffers, 6–2, 2–6, 7–6(7–4)

Wheelchair women's doubles

  Yui Kamiji /  Jordanne Whiley defeated  Jiske Griffioen /  Aniek van Koot, 6–4, 3–6, 6–3

Wheelchair quad doubles

  Nick Taylor /  David Wagner defeated  Andrew Lapthorne /  Lucas Sithole, 6–3, 7–5

Singles seeds
Seedings are based on rankings as of August 18, 2014. Rankings and points before are as of August 25, 2014.

Men's singles

Withdrawn players

Women's singles

†The player did not qualify for the tournament in 2013. Accordingly, this was the 16th best result deducted instead.

Withdrawn players

Doubles seeds

Men's doubles

 
 1 Rankings are as of 18 August 2014.

Women's doubles

 
 1 Rankings are as of 18 August 2014.

Mixed doubles

 1 Rankings are as of 18 August 2014.

Wild card entries

Men's Singles
  Jared Donaldson
  Marcos Giron
  Ryan Harrison
  Michaël Llodra
  Wayne Odesnik
  Noah Rubin
  Tim Smyczek
  Bernard Tomic
Source: USTA – Men's Singles Wild Cards

Women's Singles
  Catherine Bellis
  Madison Brengle
  Danielle Collins
  Jarmila Gajdošová
  Nicole Gibbs
  Amandine Hesse
  Grace Min
  Taylor Townsend
Source: USTA – Women's Singles Wild Cards

Men's Doubles
  Chase Buchanan /  Tennys Sandgren
  Jared Donaldson /  Michael Russell
  Marcos Giron /  Kevin King
  Bradley Klahn /  Tim Smyczek
  Peter Kobelt /  Hunter Reese
  Stefan Kozlov /  Noah Rubin
  Michael Mmoh /  Francis Tiafoe
Source: USTA – Men's Doubles Wild Cards

Women's Doubles
  Tornado Alicia Black /  Bernarda Pera
  Jennifer Brady /  Samantha Crawford
  Louisa Chirico /  Katerina Stewart
  Irina Falconi /  Anna Tatishvili
  Nicole Gibbs /  Maria Sanchez
  Grace Min /  Melanie Oudin
  Asia Muhammad /  Taylor Townsend
Source: USTA – Women's Doubles Wild Cards

Mixed Doubles
  Tornado Alicia Black /  Ernesto Escobedo
  Jacqueline Cako /  Joel Kielbowicz
  Lauren Davis /  Nicholas Monroe
  Christina McHale /  Stefan Kozlov
  Asia Muhammad /  Taylor Harry Fritz
  Melanie Oudin /  Rajeev Ram
  Shelby Rogers /  Bradley Klahn
  Taylor Townsend /  Donald Young
Source: USTA – Mixed Doubles Wild Cards

Qualifiers entries

Men's singles

 Marco Chiudinelli
 Niels Desein
 Filip Krajinović
 Facundo Bagnis
 Yoshihito Nishioka
 Illya Marchenko
 Andreas Beck
 Alexander Kudryavtsev
 Peter Gojowczyk
 Taro Daniel
 Tatsuma Ito
 Matthias Bachinger
 James McGee
 Steve Darcis
 Radu Albot
 Borna Ćorić

Women's singles

 Wang Qiang
 Maryna Zanevska
 Lesia Tsurenko
 Alla Kudryavtseva
 Ashleigh Barty
 Ksenia Pervak
 Françoise Abanda
 Duan Yingying
 Ons Jabeur
 Aleksandra Krunić
 Chan Yung-jan
 Anastasia Rodionova
 Mirjana Lučić-Baroni
 Paula Kania
 Zheng Saisai
 Aliaksandra Sasnovich

Protected ranking
The following players were accepted directly into the main draw using a protected ranking:

Women's Singles
  Romina Oprandi (PR 40)

Withdrawals 
The following players were accepted directly into the main tournament, but withdrew with injuries.
Before the tournament

Men's Singles
 Nicolás Almagro → replaced by  Damir Džumhur
 Juan Martín del Potro → replaced by  Máximo González
 Alexandr Dolgopolov → replaced by  Albert Montañés
 Tommy Haas → replaced by  Marcos Baghdatis
 Florian Mayer → replaced by  Simone Bolelli
 Rafael Nadal → replaced by  Kenny de Schepper
 Stéphane Robert → replaced by  Evgeny Donskoy

Women's Singles
  Victoria Duval → replaced by  Virginie Razzano
  Alisa Kleybanova → replaced by  Shelby Rogers
  Li Na → replaced by  Aleksandra Wozniak

See also
US Open (tennis)

References

External links
Official website

 
 

 
 

 
2014 ATP World Tour
2014 in American tennis
2014 in tennis
2014 WTA Tour
2014
2014 in sports in New York City
August 2014 sports events in the United States
September 2014 sports events in the United States